Unfaithful is a 1931 American Pre-Code drama film directed by John Cromwell, written by Eve Unsell and John Van Druten, and starring Ruth Chatterton, Paul Lukas, Paul Cavanagh, Juliette Compton, Donald Cook and Emily Fitzroy. It was released on March 14, 1931, by Paramount Pictures.

Plot
“A woman sacrifices her good name to save her brother from being disillusioned by his wife's unfaithfulness.”

Cast
Ruth Chatterton as Lady Fay Kilkerry
Paul Lukas as Colin Graham
Paul Cavanagh as Ronald Killkerry
Juliette Compton as Gemma Houston
Donald Cook as Terry Houston
Emily Fitzroy as Auntie Janie
Leslie Palmer as Jeffries
Syd Saylor as Buck
Bruce Warren as Steve
Arnold Lucy as Bishop
David Cavendish as Gerald 
Ambrose Barker as Tinker
Stella Moore as Iris
George Jackson as Count Carini
Eric Kalkhurst as Frank
Douglas Gilmore as A Drunk
Jack Richardson as Armstrong
Donald MacKenzie as Inspector

Footnotes

References
Canham, Kingsley. 1976. The Hollywood Professionals, Volume 5: King Vidor, John Cromwell, Mervyn LeRoy. The Tantivy Press, London.

External links 
 

1931 films
1931 drama films
Adultery in films
American drama films
American black-and-white films
Films directed by John Cromwell
Paramount Pictures films
Films scored by Karl Hajos
1930s English-language films
1930s American films